Fox Fritillary Meadow is a  biological Site of Special Scientific Interest north of Framsden in Suffolk. It is owned and managed by the Suffolk Wildlife Trust.

This unimproved meadow is located on heavy alluvial soils at the bottom of a valley. It has a rich variety of flora, including the herbs cowslip, cuckooflower and ragged robin, together with the largest population in East Anglia of the rare snake's head fritillary.

This site is closed to the public apart from an open day in April.

References

Suffolk Wildlife Trust
Sites of Special Scientific Interest in Suffolk